This is a list of episodes for The Daily Show with Jon Stewart in 2005.

2005

January

February

March

April

May

June

July

August

September

October

November

December

References

 
Daily Show guests
Daily Show guests (2005)